St. John the Baptist Parish Church (Filipino: Simbahan ng Parokya ni San Juan Bautista), commonly known as Calamba Church, is the oldest Roman Catholic church in Calamba, Laguna, Philippines under the Roman Catholic Diocese of San Pablo. It is located adjacent to Rizal Shrine and is known as the christening site of José Rizal.

History 
Jesuit Missionaries in 1757 purchased a big portion of land called Hacienda de San Juan for their missions but the parish was only established in 1779 by the Franciscan Friars upon gaining independence from the parochial church of Cabuyao (formerly known as Tabuco). The stone church was originally built in 1859 but destroyed on February 12, 1945 during the Second World War. The reconstruction of the church of Calamba was headed by Father Eliseo Dimaculangan. The original altar was burned in 1862 but immediately rebuilt by Father Leoncio Lopez. The first Filipino priest, Father Angel Villaruz, served the longest in this church for 43 years since 1901.

Features 
The church of Calamba is a stone church built under the Baroque style. It has several stained glasses, two of which are in the church entrance depicting St. Dominic and San Lorenzo Ruiz. Other stained windows depicts the seven holy sacraments of the Church such as baptism, reconciliation, confirmation and among others.

Baptistery 
The church baptistery where Rizal was baptized on June 22, 1861 by the then parish priest of Calamba Father Rufino Collantes and his godfather Father Pedro Casanas is a recognized National Historical Landmark (Level 1). The declaration was made by virtue of Resolution No. 2 of the Philippine Historical Commission (now National Historical Commission of the Philippines) on August 19, 1976 under Section 4 of the Executive Order No. 260 dated August 1, 1973 and amended by Executive Order No. 375 dated January 14, 1974. The original baptismal font was restored including original church items and reliquaries during Rizal's time. A transcript of Rizal's existing baptismal record is displayed on the left side of the baptistery entrance. The original baptismal records including the canonical books were lost on September 28, 1862 when Calamba Church was burned.

The transcript of Rizal's baptismal certificate issued by Father Leoncio Lopez originally written in Spanish  is shown below:

{{cquote|I, the parish priest of the town of Calamba, whose signature appears below, certify that as a result of inquiries, which with the proper authorization were made for the restoration of the canonical books (that were burned) on the 28th of September 1862 and are found in the file of baptisms, book n 1, page 49, it emerges according to the declaration of competent and sworn witnesses that Jose Rizal Mercado is legitimate son from the legitimate matrimony of Don Francisco Rizal Mercado and Dona Teodora Realonda (that) he was baptized in this parish on the 22nd of June 1861 by the parish priest Reverend Father Rufino Collantes, and his godfather was the Reverend Father Pedro Casanas. And I sign this as true. -Leoncio Lopez.}}

 Garden of Gethsemane 
The Garden of Gethsemane, located at the right side facing the church entrance, was a small garden designed for devotees who wants to meditate or pray. It contained 14 life-size bar reliefs of the Stations of the Cross,  a Well of Repentance or "Balon ng Pagbabalik Loob''" and a statue of St John the Baptist. These were demolished in 2019.

Other Church Sections 
The church also includes an adoration chapel at the right side of the main church entrance and an adjacent mini-museum. Upon entering the church complex, there is a columbarium on the right side facing the church entrance.

Notes

Bibliography

External links 

 The Roman Catholic Parish Church of Saint John the Baptist City of Calamba (Official Facebook page)

Calamba, Laguna
Buildings and structures in Calamba, Laguna
Calamba, Laguna
Calamba, Laguna
Calamba, Laguna
Churches in the Roman Catholic Diocese of San Pablo